Chaetostoma marmorescens is a species of catfish in the family Loricariidae. It is native to South America, where it occurs in the Huallaga River basin in the Marañón River drainage in Peru. The species reaches 13.5 cm (5.3 inches) SL and reportedly inhabits high-altitude areas.

References 

marmorescens
Fish described in 1942